Ostrov is a commune in Constanța County, Northern Dobruja, Romania.

Name
The name Ostrov is a word of Bulgarian origin and it means "island". The village itself is not located on an island, but rather on the banks of the Danube.

Villages
The commune includes six villages:
 Ostrov
 Almălău (historical name: Almaliul)
 Bugeac 
 Esechioi
 Galița
 Gârlița

Geography
Ostrov is close to the Bulgarian border, with a border crossing linking it to the Bulgarian city of Silistra. The locality was a town until 1950.

Demographics
At the 2011 census, Ostrov had 4,730 Romanians (95.54%), 187 Roma  (3.78%), 30 Turks (0.61%), 4 others (0.08%).

Natives
 Traian Cocorăscu
 Ionuț Țenea

Păcuiul lui Soare

Păcuiul lui Soare is the name of a fortress on an island close to Ostrov. The ruins from the beginning of 8th century belong to the "Glorious Palace" of the First Bulgarian Khans on Danube and main base of the Bulgarian Danube fleet, as researchers suppose. They found many Protobulgarian marks graved in the blocks of the stone masonry of fortress that build pretty similar to the imperial capital Pliska.
The stone graving text from the "Holy 40 martyrs column" found in Tarnovo indicate that the Great Khan Omurtag (?-831) built, maybe over Byzantine ruins, the medieval port and palace complex.

References

External links
  Ostrov at the Constanța County Council website

Communes in Constanța County
Localities in Northern Dobruja
Bulgaria–Romania border crossings